is a 2009 Japanese historical fantasy film written and directed by Kazuaki Kiriya. It is loosely based on the story of Ishikawa Goemon, a legendary outlaw hero who stole valuables from the rich and gave them to the poor. The film is a fictional account of Goemon's exploits and his role during the final phase of Sengoku period, particularly the period leading up to the decisive Battle of Sekigahara. Like Kiriya's previous film, Casshern, Goemon was filmed on a digital backlot, and made use of over 2,500 visual effects.

Goemon was released in North America on DVD and Blu-ray Disc by Funimation on April 19, 2011, and features an English dubbed audio track.

Plot

In the middle of the bloody Sengoku period, young Ishikawa Goemon watches his entire family assassinated for political reasons. Running away with his caretaker, they are attacked by bandits but saved by the warlord Oda Nobunaga. Goemon follows Nobunaga to his castle where the ninja Hattori Hanzō is assigned to train him along with his martial brother, Kirigakure Saizō. Goemon is assigned to protect Nobunaga's niece, Chacha. Before leaving, Chacha gives Goemon her favorite fan as a memento and Nobunaga gives him his double-bladed sword as reward for protecting his niece. Meanwhile, Nobunaga's generals Toyotomi Hideyoshi and Akechi Mitsuhide conspire to kill him. The two make a secret written covenant, placing their signatures onto a black scroll. Mitsuhide, not trusting Hideyoshi, has his men hide the contract in a ruined Buddhist temple. After assassinating Nobunaga, Hideyoshi betrays and kills Mitsuhide, taking credit for slaying Nobunaga's killer, and becomes the new ruler of Japan. With Nobunaga dead, Goemon and Saizo part ways: Saizo chooses to remain in service to the Oda clan while Goemon chooses to leave. As a parting gift, Goemon divides his double-bladed sword in two and gives one-half to Saizo.

Years later, Goemon becomes an outlaw. Sarutobi Sasuke, an inexperienced bounty hunter, tries to arrest Goemon, but fails and becomes his private attendant instead. During a festival, Goemon infiltrates and robs a treasure repository that houses a mysterious foreign box. Ishida Mitsunari, a high-ranking samurai serving Hideyoshi, arrives to retrieve this box to destroy it but Goemon escapes with it. Unaware of the value of the box, Goemon throws it away and distributes the gold to the poor while a young pick-pocket named Koheita picks up the mysterious box and keeps it as a memento. The following day, Goemon learns of the box's value from Sasuke and returns to the city to find it. Goemon finds Koheita and his mother, who has just been callously murdered by cruel and petty local samurai. Goemon saves Koheita and retrieves the box.

Saizo and his ninja squad appear and confronts Goemon. Goemon flees but is chased by Saizo's team. Goemon evades all of his pursuers except Saizo, who challenges him to a duel. Saizo informs him that the box is referred to as a "Pandora's Box" by foreigners. Just as Saizo prepares to kill Goemon, Hattori Hanzo intervenes, causing Saizo to withdraw. After returning to the city, Goemon examines the "empty box" and discovers a map leading to a mysterious treasure. Following the map, Goemon and Sasuke are led to the destroyed Buddhist temple where Akechi Mitsuhide had hidden his contract with Hideyoshi. Goemon becomes angry once he learns of Hideyoshi's involvement in Nobunaga's death. Hanzo, now serving under the warlord Tokugawa Ieyasu, reappears and offers his old student a bag of gold for the contract, which Goemon accepts. Seeking vengeance for his murdered lord, Goemon infiltrates Hideyoshi's palace and kills him. To Goemon's shock, he discovers the real Hideyoshi enter the room, realizing he just killed his fake double. Suddenly, one of Hideyoshi's guards discovers Goemon and shoots him. Goemon is rescued by Saizo.

Goemon is then contacted by Hanzo, who takes him to a waterfall to meet with Chacha. Chacha bids Goemon farewell and returns the fan, revealing she has agreed to become Hideyoshi's concubine. Later on, Tokugawa arrives and asks Goemon to assassinate Hideyoshi in order to save the country. Meanwhile, Mitsunari offers Saizo samurai status in return for killing Hideyoshi. During Hideyoshi and Chacha's wedding aboard a royal ship, Goemon prepares to kill him but suddenly changes his mind. Moments later, all of Hideyoshi's escort ships are destroyed by explosives set by Saizo and his team. They capture Hideyoshi and assassinate him. Believing Hideyoshi to be dead, Mitsunari turns on Saizo and shoots him. However, Hideyoshi and Saizo survive. Hideyoshi, unaware of Mitsunari's betrayal, interrogates Saizo. Soon after, Goemon saves Saizo.

Saizo races to rescue his family, only to find that Mitsunari had kidnapped his infant child and killed his wife in reprisal. Saizo is later recaptured and Hideyoshi condemns him to death by boiling. Hideyoshi tells Saizo he would spare his child's life if he reveals his name. Instead, he falsely identifies himself as Goemon. Goemon tries in vain to stop the execution, but Hideyoshi kicks Saizo into the cauldron along with his child. With the help of Saizo's team, Goemon storms through the palace. Goemon discovers that Hideyoshi murdered Nobunaga, provoking Goemon to finally kill him. He rescues Chacha, finally reuniting with her. With Hideyoshi dead, a power struggle between Tokugawa and Mitsunari begins. Goemon decides to intervene.

Goemon charges into the battle wearing Nobunaga's armor and carrying his fully repaired double-bladed sword. His appearance instills fear in the warring armies as they believe Nobunaga has returned. Goemon fights through the armies until he reaches and kills Mitsunari. Mitsunari's army retreats in fear. Goemon then charges through Tokugawa's army, but Hattori Hanzo intercepts him mid-way. Goemon immobilizes Hanzo by pinning his foot to the ground with a broken sword blade, allowing him to approach Tokugawa. As Goemon closes in to kill Tokugawa, he is mortally wounded by Sasuke, Goemon staggers and reveals that he is only holding Chacha's fan. Tokugawa agrees to peace, and Goemon leaves the battlefield. Goemon struggles to make his way back to Chacha, but he dies of his wounds while watching the fireflies.

Cast

English dubbing staff
Dubbing director: 
Dubbing studio: Funimation
Media: DVD/Blu-ray Disc

Reception
The film was nominated at the Asian Film Awards in 2010 for the categories of Best Costume Designer (Vaughan Alexander and Tina Kalivas) and Best Visual Effects (Takuya Fujita and Kôji Nozaki).

According to Twitch Film, "Goemon is going to be a divisive film ... It fits in well with their live action catalog of films like Shinobi: Heart Under Blade and yet it feels like a live action anime." According to a DVD Verdict review by Paul Pritchard, Goemon "entertains with its combination of imaginative visuals and exciting action sequences, but leaves you wanting for more". The Blu-ray Disc version was "highly recommended" by Blu-ray.com.

Soundtrack
The soundtrack to Goemon, composed by Akihiko Matsumoto, was released in Japan on April 22, 2009, by Columbia Music Entertainment. The film's theme song, "Rosa -Movie Mix-", composed by Yoshiki and performed by Violet UK, was released on iTunes seven days later on April 29, 2009.

References

External links
 

2009 action films
2009 films
Cultural depictions of Akechi Mitsuhide
Cultural depictions of Hattori Hanzō
Cultural depictions of Oda Nobunaga
Cultural depictions of Tokugawa Ieyasu
Cultural depictions of Toyotomi Hideyoshi
Funimation
2000s Japanese-language films
Ninja films
Sengoku period in fiction
Shochiku films